A balisword is an exceptionally large balisong. Similar to a normal balisong, two hilts cover the blade of a balisword. These handles fold away from the blade to expose it.

The term "balisword" is a portmanteau of the words "balisong" and "sword". It describes the unique design of both the sword and the hilt(s). Baliswords can reach from traditional 2 feet, to over 6 feet in length.

Unlike the normal balisong, the balisword is not generally used for performing tricks, known as "flipping", as the handles and blade maintain enough momentum to cause injury if they were to close on a hand. So users typically open a balisword with two hands rather than one.

References

Blade weapons
Filipino swords